Highway 20, more commonly known as the Ayalon Highway, or simply Ayalon (pronounced: "Netivei Ayalon", lit. "Ayalon lanes"), is a major intracity freeway in Gush Dan, Israel. The road runs along the eastern border of central Tel Aviv from north to south (with a planned east-west branch as well) and connects all of the major highways leading to the city—such as Highway 4 from Ashdod and the Southern regions, Highway 2 from Haifa and the Northern regions, Highway 5 from the East, and Highway 1 from Jerusalem and the Southeast. The Ayalon Highway is heavily used; on an average day almost 600,000 vehicles enter the freeway. It consists of a multi-lane highway with a multi-track railway located between the opposite travel lanes. Some of the highway's route is along the Ayalon River, hence its name.

Background 
Before the construction of the Ayalon Highway, all the major inter-city highways leading to Tel Aviv terminated in the outskirts of the city. This created major traffic congestion in the entry and exit points and made driving through the city difficult. Moreover, before the highway, Tel Aviv had two separate railway stations, one in the north and one in the south, which were not connected. Thus passengers wanting to travel to the South of the country could only do so from the southern station and those who wanted to travel to the North could only do so from the northern (Central) station. Even worse, trains from the northern part of the country could not travel to the southern part of the country without bypassing Tel Aviv from the east, making train travel in Israel very inefficient. Finally there was the problem of the Ayalon River, which went through parts of Tel Aviv and would sometimes cause flooding.

To solve these problems, as early as the 1950s, ideas were raised regarding using the route of the river as a transportation corridor, but it wasn't until the mid-1960s that the government began planning. In the 1970s a government-owned company, Ayalon Highways Ltd., was set up to construct the highway. The first phase included construction of a concrete channel for the Ayalon River to alleviate the flooding problem. In 1982, the first section of the road opened, and, in 1991, the final section of the central part of the road was completed. This section connects Highway 1 in the south with Highway 5 and Highway 2 in the north through the very center of the Gush Dan metropolitan area. The Ayalon Railway section of the Coastal Railway and four stations were built in the center of the highway, which provided for the long-sought connection of Israel's railway network through Tel Aviv.

In the early 1990s the construction of a southern section of the highway had started. This section goes from Tel Aviv HaHagana railway station through the southern Tel Aviv suburbs of Holon, Bat Yam and Rishon LeZion and connects to Highway 4 north of Yavne. After the highway splits with the Ayalon River at Highway 1, it goes on the route of a road called Heyl HaShiryon Road ("The Armored Corps Road"), then on the route of Yigael Yadin Road until Wolfson Interchange, where it goes on the route of Yigal Allon Road.

Previously, the northern terminus of the road was in Herzliya, but in January 2019 it was extended further north to near the kibbutz of Shefayim, where it has another connection to Highway 2 built as part of the Route 531 construction project.

Impact 

The road and railway had a major impact on the Tel Aviv region. While quite congested at times it nevertheless alleviated traveling to and through Tel Aviv. Considerable real estate development of offices, shopping, and housing occurred along the route, so much so, that Tel Aviv's Central Business District lost much of its importance as many businesses relocated to near the road. Israel Railways saw huge increases in passenger numbers now that north/south trains could travel through Tel Aviv instead of around it.

Plans
The southern part of the highway (i.e., the section passing through the Holon, Bat Yam and Rishon LeZion suburbs) was completed in 2012, including a second overpass in the Holon interchange and dual track railroad and six stations in the median of the highway (as part of a project which extended the Coastal Railway to Ashdod). An east-west branch "Ayalon East", from Highway 4 to the Tel Aviv University railway station along the path of the Yarkon River has been planned, but is still not approved.

The central section of the road is built along the banks of the Ayalon River. However, Israel railways is in desperate need of adding a fourth railroad track in that area and no space exists to do so but "on top" of the river itself. Over the decades several suggestions have been made to solve this problem, ranging from diverting the entire river through Jaffa, to building an elevated highway, to creating a man-made lake for capturing flooding overflow south of the city and burying the river in a large diameter pipe and constructing the railway on top of it. In 2018 a plan was finally approved to undertake a multi-billion Shekel project to add the forth track although construction is not expected to commence until the early 2020s decade.

Under construction as of 2020 are HOV lanes extending nearly the entire length of the Highway, together with large park & ride facilities located in the approaches to the Gush Dan region. These parking facilities will be served by free express public shuttle buses which will ferry passengers from the parking lots to various locations inside the Gush Dan metropolitan area via the new HOV lanes.

The long-term projection is for Route 20 to run as far north as Hadera. However, this has garnered very strong opposition from environmental groups, since the road would have to cross a nature preserve and other sensitive environmental areas. These groups suggest widening Highway 2 (the so-called "Coastal Highway"), an existing freeway north of Tel Aviv which roughly parallels (several kilometers to the west) Route 20's future route, instead of extending Route 20 northwards.

Interchanges

List of interchanges in order from the southernmost at Gan Sorek to the northernmost at Rishpon:

Railway stations are located nearby the following interchanges (with station name in parenthesis, if differs from interchange name): Shiv'at HaKohavim (Herzliyya), Rokach (University), Arlozorov (Tel Aviv Central), HaShalom, Kibbutz Galuyot (HaHagana), Holon, Wolfson, Yoseftal, Komemiyut, Moshe Dayan.

References

External links

Ayalon Highways Ltd. – Official site. Includes up to the minute traffic reports and live traffic camera views.
Transport Today and Tomorrow

20
20
Transport in Tel Aviv
Streets in Tel Aviv